New Tradiciones is the debut solo studio album by American singer Adrienne Bailon under her married name Adrienne Houghton. It was released on November 17, 2017, through the Bridge Music label.
The album features Bailon singing Christmas songs in both English and Spanish over Latin and holiday music. All proceeds from the album go toward rebuilding Puerto Rico after the devastating Hurricane Irma destroyed over 50 percent of the island.

Track listing
 "The Gift" – 3:36
 "Feliz Navidad"/"Siento la Navidad" – 5:34
 "La Murga" (featuring Angelo Pagan) – 4:20
 "Parrandas Medley" – 5:25
 "Aires de Navidad" (featuring Tito Nieves) – 3:30
 "Baby, It's Cold Outside"/"Frío Frío" (featuring Israel Houghton) – 3:30
 "Oh, Holy Night" (featuring Justo Almario) – 6:01
 "Christmas Worship Medley" (featuring Israel Houghton) – 8:19
 "Mi Burrito Sabanero" (featuring Jet Marie, Beau Harper, Claudette Bailon, Freddy Bailon) – 4:33
 "Have Yourself a Merry Little Christmas" – 5:57
 "Mi Regalo Es Tú (The Gift)" – 3:35

Chart

References 

2017 albums